Oak Bay is a municipality incorporated in 1906 that is located on the southern tip of Vancouver Island, in the Canadian province of British Columbia. It is one of thirteen member municipalities of the Capital Regional District, and is bordered to the west by the city of Victoria and to the north by the district of Saanich.

History

Oak Bay is part of the traditional territories of the Coast Salish people of the Songhees First Nation.  Evidence of their ancient settlements has been found along local shores, including Willows Beach, where an ancient Lkwungen seaport known as Sitchanalth was centred around the mouth of the river commonly known as Bowker Creek. Sitchanalth is hypothesized to have been destroyed by the great Tsunami of 930 AD. Much of this neighbourhood is built upon an Indigenous burial ground.

Oak Bay takes its name from the Garry oak tree, which is found throughout the region, and also the name of the large bay on the eastern shore of the municipality, fronting onto Willows Beach.

John Tod, in 1850, built on a  farm that is today the oldest continuously-occupied home in Western Canada. Tod was the Chief Fur Trader for the Hudson's Bay Company for Kamloops, one of the original appointed members of BC's Legislative Council.
 
Originally developed as a middle class streetcar suburb of Victoria, Oak Bay was incorporated as a municipality in 1906. Its first Council included Francis Rattenbury, the architect who designed the Legislative Buildings and Empress Hotel located on the inner harbour in Victoria. Rattenbury's own home on Beach Drive is now used as the junior campus for Glenlyon Norfolk School. In 1912, the former farm lands of the Hudson's Bay Company were subdivided to create the Uplands area, but development was hampered by the outbreak of World War I. After the war, development of expensive homes in the Uplands was accompanied by the construction of many more single-family dwellings in the Estevan, Willows and South Oak Bay neighbourhoods.

The Victoria Golf Club is located in South Oak Bay. It was founded in 1893, and is the second oldest golf course west of the Great Lakes. It is a 6,120 yard links course on the ocean side, and claims to be the oldest golf course in Canada still on its original site. The course is reported to be haunted.

The Royal Victoria Yacht Club was formed on June 8, 1892, and moved in 1912 to its current location, at the location of the old Hudson's Bay Company cattle wharf.

In 1925, the Victoria Cougars won the Stanley Cup at the Patrick Arena in Oak Bay, defeating the Montreal Canadiens in four games. The arena was soon after destroyed by fire in 1929. Nowadays, the Victoria Cougars are the Detroit Red Wings of the National Hockey League.

The Oak Bay Marina, built in 1962, was officially opened in April 1964. It replaced the Oak Bay Boat House built in 1893. The breakwater was built in 1959 and funded by the federal government.

There have reportedly been sightings of a sea monster known as the Cadborosaurus off Oak Bay, with both reports dating back to before European settlement in the area.

Demographics 

Ethnicity

Religion 
According to the 2021 census, religious groups in Oak Bay included:
Irreligion (10,250 persons or 58.1%)
Christianity (6,430 persons or 36.5%)
Judaism (260 persons or 1.5%)
Buddhism (170 persons or 1.0%)
Sikhism (120 persons or 0.7%)
Islam (85 persons or 0.5%)
Hinduism (50 persons or 0.3%)
Other (280 persons or 1.6%)

Film studio
During the 1930s, Oak Bay, British Columbia was the original "Hollywood North" when fourteen films were produced in Greater Victoria between 1933 and 1938. In 1932 Kenneth James Bishop leased an off-season exhibition building on the Willows Fairgrounds was converted to a film sound stage to produce films for the British film quota system under the Cinematograph Films Act 1927 and films were produced with Hollywood stars such as Lillian Gish, Paul Muni, Sir Cedric Hardwicke, Edith Fellows, Charles Starrett and Rin Tin Tin Jr. Film production was curtailed when the Cinematograph Films Act 1938 specified only British made films would be included in the quota.
 
The Willows Park Studio films include: 
1933 
The Crimson Paradise ("Fighting Playboy" in the US) (The first all talking motion picture in Canada.)

1935
Secrets of Chinatown (Production Company was Commonwealth Productions Ltd. based on the out of print book The Black Robe by Guy Morton. Kathleen Dunsmuir invested $50,000 in the film. Before completion of the film Commonwealth Productions went bankrupt, Northern Films Ltd. completed post production of the film, Kathleen Dunsmuir lost all $50,000. The film is technically British it received British film registration number br. 11391. The film was seized by the police at request of the Chinese Consul with the claim it was offensive, the film was altered before its release. In Victoria Harry Hewitson the actor playing Chan Tow Ling would remind the audience with the warning it was fictional. In addition to Chinatown and surrounding downtown Victoria the Gonzales area is used in outdoor shots if
the film.)

1936
Fury and the Woman (aka Lucky Corrigan)
Lucky Fugitives
Secret Patrol 
Stampede
Tugboat Princess
1937
What Price Vengeance?
Manhattan Shakedown
Murder is News
Woman Against the World
Death Goes North
1938
Convicted
Special Inspector
1942
Commandos Strike at Dawn

Climate

Education
Oak Bay is the home of the University of Victoria, a public research institution in the Capital Region District. While much of the University of Victoria campus is located within the District of Oak Bay, parts of it are also located in the adjacent municipality of Saanich.

Oak Bay also hosts a number of academically focused public and private secondary schools which are part of School District 61. There is one public elementary school, Willows Elementary, one public middle school, Monterey Middle School, and one public high school, Oak Bay High School, with the largest student population in the Greater Victoria School District. Residents in the South Oak Bay area may also register their children at the nearby Margaret Jenkins Elementary (in Victoria). In addition to public schools, there are two private schools located in Oak Bay, Glenlyon Norfolk School and St. Michael's University School.

Neighbourhoods
 North Oak Bay
 South Oak Bay
 Uplands
Henderson
Gonzales
Estevan

Parks and recreation centres
Parks
 Anderson Hill Park - The Vancouver Island Trail's southern terminus is located here
 Uplands Park / Cattle Point (a Garry oak ecosystem). 
 Willows Beach

Public safety
 Oak Bay Emergency Program
 Oak Bay Fire Department - The Oak Bay Fire Department was formed in 1937.
 Oak Bay Police Department - The Oak Bay Police Department was formed in 1906.
 Oak Bay Sea Rescue (OBSR) - Royal Canadian Marine Search and Rescue Station 33 (RCM-SAR) - Oak Bay Sea Rescue was formed in 1977, and is a volunteer organisation. The Unit's Boats are based out of Oak Bay Marina

See also
 McNeill Bay (British Columbia)

Notes

References

Oak Bay, British Columbia: in Photographs 1906-2006 (book)

Only in Oak Bay Oak Bay Municipality: 1906-1981 (book)

External links

Populated places on the British Columbia Coast
District municipalities in British Columbia
Populated places in the Capital Regional District
Greater Victoria